Selaru is an Austronesian language of Selaru and Yamdena, in the Maluku Islands of Indonesia. Linguistically it is not close to Seluwasan, its nearest relative.

Phonology

Consonants 

  can be heard as  before velar stops.
  can be heard as  within voiced environments.
 Consonants preceding glide sounds are heard as either palatalized or labialized .

Vowels

References

Further reading 

 
 
 

Central Malayo-Polynesian languages
Languages of the Maluku Islands